The 1975 Wittenberg Tigers football team was an American football team that represented Wittenberg University in the Ohio Athletic Conference (OAC) during the 1975 NCAA Division III football season.

Schedule

References

Wittenberg
Wittenberg Tigers football seasons
NCAA Division III Football Champions
College football undefeated seasons
Wittenberg Tigers football